The Sturgis One Room School is a historic U.S. school located at 209 Willow Street, Pocomoke City, Maryland.  The community used this one room school from 1900 to 1937.  It was originally known as Sturgis School and was located on Brantley Road.  It was moved to its current location in 1996.  The school currently serves as The Sturgis One Room School Museum.

The Sturgis One Room School Museum
The Sturgis One Room School Museum illustrates how education was conducted in the local area during the early 20th century

Footnotes

External links
Sturgis One Room School Museum (Ocean City Vacation and Hotels Guide website)

Defunct schools in Maryland
One-room schoolhouses in Maryland
Schoolhouses in the United States
Museums in Worcester County, Maryland
Education museums in the United States
History museums in Maryland
Pocomoke City, Maryland
School buildings completed in 1900
1900 establishments in Maryland